Arden Rose Ricks (born May 3, 1995) is an American actress, author, and internet personality.

Personal life 
Rose was born on May 3, 1995 in Arkansas. She has been in a relationship with British YouTuber Will Darbyshire since 2015. They became engaged in September 2021.

Acting 
Rose starred as Hadley Pulito on Mr. Student Body President, which was produced by New Form, and aired on go90 in the United States and Channel 4 in the UK.

Rose also starred in season 2 of AwesomenessTV's Guidance on go90 in 2016.

Books 
Rose's debut book Almost Adulting was released by HarperCollins in March 2017.

References

External links

21st-century American actresses
American Internet celebrities
1995 births
Living people
Actresses from Arkansas
Actresses from Los Angeles
Writers from Arkansas
Writers from Los Angeles